Fagge is a Local Government Area in Kano State, Nigeria, within the state metropolitan . Its headquarters are in the suburb of Waje.

It has an area of 21 km and a population of 198,828 at the 2006 census.

The postal code of the area is 700.

References

Local Government Areas in Kano State